Arif Setiawan (born 4 September 1996) is an Indonesian professional footballer who plays as a left back for Liga 1 club Persita Tangerang.

Club career

Bhayangkara FC
He was signed for Bhayangkara to play in the Liga 1 in the 2019 season. Arif made his league debut on 5 August 2019 in a match against Madura United at the PTIK Stadium, Jakarta.

Persik Kediri (loan)
He was signed for Persik Kediri to play in the Liga 1 in the 2020 season, on loan from Bhayangkara. This season was suspended on 27 March 2020 due to the COVID-19 pandemic. The season was abandoned and was declared void on 20 January 2021.

Dewa United
In 2021, Arif Setiawan signed a contract with Indonesian Liga 2 club Dewa United. He made his league debut on 28 September against RANS Cilegon at the Gelora Bung Karno Madya Stadium, Jakarta.

Persita Tengerang
Arif was signed for Persita Tangerang to play in Liga 1 in the 2022–23 season. He made his league debut on 25 July 2022 in a match against Persik Kediri at the Indomilk Arena, Tangerang.

Honours

Club 
Dewa United
 Liga 2 third place (play-offs): 2021

References

External links
 Arif Setiawan at Soccerway
 Arif Setiawan at Liga Indonesia

1996 births
Living people
Indonesian footballers
Liga 2 (Indonesia) players
Liga 1 (Indonesia) players
PSBL Langsa players
Bhayangkara F.C. players
Persik Kediri players
Dewa United F.C. players
Persita Tangerang players
Association football defenders
People from Banda Aceh
Sportspeople from Aceh